Louise Henrietta of Nassau (7 December 1627 – 18 June 1667) was a Countess of Nassau, granddaughter of William I, Prince of Orange, "William the Silent", and an Electress of Brandenburg.

Biography
Louise Henriëtte was born in The Hague, the eldest daughter of Frederick Henry, Prince of Orange, and Amalia of Solms-Braunfels. She grew up at the court of her father, the Stadtholder of Holland, Zeeland, Utrecht, Guelders and Overijssel.

Marriage
Louise Henriëtte had to abandon her love for Henri Charles de La Trémoille, Prince of Talmant, son of Henry de La Trémoille, as her mother had royal ambitions for her. However, attempts to conclude an engagement with King Charles II of England came to nothing. Finally she was forced to marry Frederick William, Elector of Brandenburg (1620-1688), "the Great Elector," at The Hague on 7 December 1646, her nineteenth birthday.

The Electorate of Brandenburg regarded this marriage as beneficial by reason of the connections with the Orange family it created in the hope of obtaining assistance for Brandenburg's struggle for influence in Pomerania.

Electress
The couple lived in Cleves for the first years of their marriage, but they moved to Brandenburg, Frederick William's seat, in 1648. During her marriage, Louise Henriëtte followed her spouse and traveled between The Hague, Königsberg, Berlin and Cleves on campaigns, inspections, war and battle fields in Poland and Denmark. She acted as her husband's political adviser and was described as a pragmatist. She managed, through correspondence with the Queen of Poland, Marie Louise Gonzaga, to make an alliance with Poland in exchange for the Polish recognition of Prussia as a province of Brandenburg. It was said of her : "Few Electresses had been allowed so much influence".
Louise Henriëtte had a new castle in Dutch style built in Bötzow in 1650-52 and called it Oranienburg, which became the name for the entire town in 1653.
She was also involved in the design and development of the Lustgarten in Berlin. In 1663, she installed the first porcelain cabinet in Europe. In 1665, she founded an orphanage with places for 24 children.
She was described as truly kind and gentle with a sharp intellect: her advice was vital for her spouse, and their marriage was considered a role model. During time of war, she made great efforts to soften the damages upon society.

A Protestant religious community known as the Luise-Henrietten-Stift in nearby Lehnin Abbey was named after her.

Children
With Frederick William, Elector of Brandenburg, she had six children.
 William Henry (1648-1649)
 Charles (1655-1674)
 Frederick (1657-1713), the first King in Prussia
 Amalie (1664-1664)
 Henry (1664-1664)
 Louis (1666-1687), married Ludwika Karolina Radziwiłł

Luise Henriette died in Berlin and was buried in the Berliner Dom.

Ancestry

External links

 http://www.spsg.de/index.php?id=129
 coloured painting of Prinzessin Luise Henriette von Oranien-Nassau, later Kurfürstin von Brandenburg

|-

|-

1627 births
1667 deaths
17th-century Dutch women
Nobility from The Hague
House of Orange-Nassau
Consorts of Brandenburg
Prussian royal consorts
Electresses of Brandenburg
Countesses of Nassau
Duchesses of Prussia
House of Hohenzollern
Burials at Berlin Cathedral
Daughters of monarchs